Veliki Brat VIP 2 is the second season of the celebrity version of Veliki Brat. It started airing on March 1, 2008 on the television channels B92, Pink BH, and Pink M. 

Celebrities from Serbia, Bosnia and Herzegovina and Montenegro were competing for €50,000. The hosts of the show were: Ana Mihajlovski and Milan Kalinić. The show lasted for 30 days and the final took place on March 30, 2008.

Housemates
Twelve housemates entered the show on Day 1. On Day 15, Anastasija entered the house.

Nominations table

Notes

External links
 Official website
 Production website (English)

02
2008 Bosnia and Herzegovina television seasons
2008 Serbian television seasons